Liquan County is a county under the administration of the prefecture-level city of Xianyang, in the central part of Shaanxi province, China. It was known as Liquan County before 1964.

Administrative divisions
As 2016, this County is divided to 12 towns.
Towns

Climate

Transport
The county is served by:
China National Highway 312
Liquan railway station on the Xi'an–Pingliang railway
Liquan South railway station on the Yinchuan–Xi'an high-speed railway

References

County-level divisions of Shaanxi
Xianyang